Jean Engstrom (born Flora Jean Bovie, July 25, 1920 – March 20, 1997) was an American actress active in regional theater, movies, and television in the 1950s and 1960s.

Background
Engstrom was born in Detroit, Michigan, on July 25, 1920, the elder of two children  
born to Clarence Augustus Bovie,
 
 an artist and commercial illustrator, and Nona Iola Cochrun.
 After her father's death, 1930 census records show that she and her mother and younger brother were living with her father's mother (paternal grandmother) in Augusta, Michigan. In 1935, they were living in Battle Creek, Michigan.
 When Engstrom was 16, the family moved to Southern California and lived for a while with her maternal grandmother, and there she completed high school.
On February 14, 1940, Flora Jean Bovie married Richard Harold Moon in Baldwin Park, California.
 On June 30, 1942, their only child, daughter Liana Jeanne Moon (later to be actress Jena Engstrom) was born. Flora Jean and Richard Moon divorced, and in about 1947 she married her second husband, Elliott E. Engstrom, who later adopted her daughter.  They remained married until her death. In the mid-1980s she developed breast cancer, had a mastectomy in July 1985, and died of breast cancer on March 20, 1997, in a convalescent hospital in Hemet, California.
Her body is buried at Fort Rosecrans National Cemetery in San Diego, California.

Career
Engstrom originally wanted to become a singer, but a crushed breast plate suffered in an automobile accident affected her vocal cords and she turned to modeling. A 1958 TV Guide article states that she began acting in 1940,  while a 1962 syndicated news articles states that she began acting in 1951. Whenever her acting career started, she began acting with little theater groups in and around the Hollywood area. She later moved to work in movies and in television and during this time studied with Francis Lederer's improvisation group. She used the name Jean Engstrom professionally and during her career she appeared in over 50 plays, in at least eight movies, and in about 40 television programs before leaving acting.

Theatrical career (regional theater)
It is not clear when Engstrom began acting in regional theater, but she spent a lot of time working in theater. By the time of the 1962 syndicated news article she told the interviewer that she had appeared in 52 plays. Her most notable stage appearance may have come in January 1961 when she appeared in the title role of George Bernard Shaw's Candida, co-starring Jeff Morrow and directed by John Newland. The play was produced by the Los Angeles-based acting, writing and directing group Projects '58 and televised by KNXT television in Los Angeles and shown by television stations across the country.

Movie career
A theatrical appearance with a stock company in Tucson, Arizona, led to a short-lived contract with Paramount Pictures. Most of Engstrom's movie appearances were in bit parts, and her first recorded appearances began in 1954 with roles as party guests in Drive a Crooked Road starring Mickey Rooney and in A Star Is Born (1954) starring Judy Garland and James Mason. In 1956, she used the name Flora Jean Engstrom for the only time when she appeared in a small role in The Search for Bridey Murphy starring Teresa Wright. Her larger roles came in more modest productions, receiving featured billing in the 1957 production Voodoo Island and the 1958 production The Space Children, which are now cult classics. Her character Claire Winter in Voodoo Island is presented as a lesbian with a crush on the leading lady played by Beverly Tyler, a theme that was unusual for its time. She also appeared as a party guest in the 1958 film The Party Crashers. Her final movie appearance was a starring role in the 1965 Billy Graham-produced The Restless Ones in which she played Mrs. Harris, the alcoholic mother of April, played by Kim Darby.

Television career
Engstrom began appearing in television in 1953 although her earliest TV appearances have not been confirmed.  Her first TV appearances recorded in current databases are in three 1955 episodes of Medic starring Richard Boone.  Between 1953 and 1965 she appeared in about 40 TV programs, mostly in supporting roles.  She appeared in westerns, crime dramas, comedies, and contemporary dramas in which she often played mothers (including an unwed mother who gives birth during an episode of Have Gun, Will Travel), but she also played wives and widows, a school psychologist, a social secretary, and even a deputy sheriff and a psychotic killer.  In addition to her three appearances on Medic she appeared twice more with Richard Boone in episodes of Have Gun, Will Travel.  She also made multiple appearances on other shows, including three appearances on Perry Mason starring Raymond Burr and two appearances each on Peter Gunn starring Craig Stevens, an electrifying turn as a diner keeper turned cold blooded killer on Highway Patrol (1957 U.S. TV series), two on Thriller starring Boris Karloff, and two on Hazel starring Shirley Booth. She appeared as Lonny Chapman's wife in "Dead Man's Tale", series 3 episode 17 of One Step Beyond in 1961.

Mother and daughter
Engstrom's daughter Liana was also an actress and appeared as Jena Engstrom in at least 37 television episodes between 1960 and 1964 (when it appears that she left acting for health reasons).  Most on-line databases and this article have listed only two of the three TV shows in which they appeared together.  The first of the two shows listed is the April 1961 episode of the CBS program Rawhide titled "Incident of the Lost Idol" in which they appeared as mother and daughter.  They had only one brief scene together as the story was not about their relationship. The second show listed is the January 1962 episode "To Sell Another Human Being" of ABC's The New Breed, starring Leslie Nielsen, in which mother Jean played a wealthy woman who with her husband (played by Richard Arlen) adopt a baby through an adoption mill.  The police get involved when the baby's natural mother, played by daughter Jena, tries to get her baby back.  The third television show in with they appeared together is an unidentified 30-minute religious program presented in 1961 in which they played mother and daughter.  In this story a girl (Jena) has trouble relating to her parents until a session with teenagers at a church is recorded and the recording made available to the parents to listen to.  Appearing in this show with Jean and Jena Engstrom are Robert Stevenson as Jena’s father and Richard Evans as her boyfriend.  This film, minus the opening and closing credits, has been posted on-line.

Confused credits
The acting credits of mother Jean and daughter Jena were confused at the time they were active together in the business resulting in mixed credits in newspapers and problems with pay checks. The mixed credits appear in some Internet databases, but the situation is improving as site managers are posting corrections as the errors are discovered.

DVDs
Several of the television series listed below have been released by their studios on DVD that are available for sale or for rent. Those marked "Yes" include sets with the episodes featuring Jean Engstrom.

Television roles

Note: "Episode" column: 2.9 indicates Season 2, Episode 9, etc.

Movie roles

References

External links
 
 

American stage actresses
American film actresses
American television actresses
Actresses from Michigan
20th-century American actresses
1920 births
1997 deaths